Ezequiel Cerutti (born 17 January 1992) is an Argentine forward who plays as a winger for San Lorenzo.

Honours

Club
Club Atlético Sarmiento
Primera B Metropolitana:  2011–12

San Lorenzo
Supercopa Argentina: 2015

Al Hilal
Saudi Professional League: 2017–18

References

External links 
 
 
 

Living people
1992 births
Argentine footballers
Argentine expatriate footballers
Argentine Primera División players
Primera Nacional players
Saudi Professional League players
Club Atlético Sarmiento footballers
Olimpo footballers
Estudiantes de La Plata footballers
San Lorenzo de Almagro footballers
Al Hilal SFC players
Coritiba Foot Ball Club players
Argentine people of Italian descent
Association football forwards
Argentine expatriate sportspeople in Saudi Arabia
Argentine expatriate sportspeople in Brazil
Expatriate footballers in Saudi Arabia
Expatriate footballers in Brazil
People from Junín, Buenos Aires
Sportspeople from Buenos Aires Province